Sylvia Jackson (born 3 December 1946) was a Scottish Labour Party politician, and former Member of the Scottish Parliament (MSP).

In the Scottish Parliament election on 3 May 2007, she lost the Stirling constituency, which she had held since 1999, to Bruce Crawford of the SNP.

Prior to her election she has worked as a lecturer at the University of Edinburgh and as a chemistry teacher.

External links 
 

1946 births
Living people
Female members of the Scottish Parliament
Labour MSPs
Members of the Scottish Parliament 1999–2003
Members of the Scottish Parliament 2003–2007
Academics of the University of Edinburgh
20th-century Scottish women politicians